PDHPE (Personal Development, Health and Physical Education) is a subject in the New South Wales school curriculum. It is a compulsory subject in the K-10 curriculum, and available as an elective in years 11 and 12 and for the HSC in year 12. It incorporates a wide range of material, including some physical education; sports science; nutrition; disease; mental health; drugs and drug abuse; relationships, and power and abuse in relationships; risk; family; road safety; sexuality, STDs, and contraception; first aid and CPR; discrimination, harassment, vilification and anti-discrimination legislation.

References 
 NSW Board of Studies, Personal Development, Health and Physical Education Years 7–10 Syllabus

Education in New South Wales
Health education in Australia
Physical education
Sex education
Sports science